Den Nye By is the debut album by Faroese alternative rock band The Dreams, released on February 8, 2008. Published by Apache Records and recorded in the Chief Management Studio. Produced by Chief 1 (Lars Pedersen). The album comprises 11 songs all written in Danish.

Three successful singles were released from this album: "La' mig være", "Himlen Falder/Helvede Kalder" and "Backstabber".

Release
They released their album at the same time their first music video "La' mig være", which directly moved into the lead in DR1 Boogie Listen. A second single, "Himlen Falder/Helvede Karlder", was released in May and also ranked first in DR1 Boogie Listen and Denmark's most popular music videos chart, finishing in the top three for ten weeks.

In October of that year, the single "Backstabber" went straight to number one in its first week in DR1 Boogie Listen and was listed in all 10 weeks as the only Danish band.

Track listing

Singles

Personnel
 Hans Edward Andreasen – vocals, guitar
 Heini Gilstón Corfitz Andersen – lead guitar, backing vocals
 Eirikur Gilstón Corfitz Andersen – bass, backing vocals
 Heini Mortensen - drums, percussion

Den Nye By 09/Sakin Live 

Den Nye By 09/Sakin Live is a live album released on March 2, 2009. Published by their new record label Black Pelican and produced by Chief 1 (Lars Pedersen), the album contains the same songs from their debut album plus three new songs: "Snob", "Lorteliv" and "25 (Den Nye By prt.2)" and the history of the band in an interview with the producer.

Two singles were released from this album: "25 (Den Nye By prt.2)" and "Ingen kan erstatte dig", this music video is a concert that they did in the Faroe Islands.

Release
Before the release of the live album, the band released "25 (Den Nye By prt.2)", a continuation of the song "22 (Den Nye By)", as the first single in December 2008. In February 2009, "Ingen kan erstatte dig" was released as the second single, finding success in the DR1 Boogie Listen when it reached number four on its list.

The album was released March 2, 2009, followed by a grand tour of Denmark and Faroe Islands.

Track listing

Singles

Personnel
 Hans Edward Andreasen – vocals, guitar
 Heini Gilstón Corfitz Andersen – lead guitar, backing vocals
 Eirikur Gilstón Corfitz Andersen – bass, backing vocals
 Heini Mortensen - drums, percussion

The Dreams albums
2008 debut albums